Oregon State Correctional Institution (OSCI) is a  medium security prison located in Salem, Oregon, United States and is operated by the Oregon Department of Corrections. Established by an act of the Oregon State Legislature in 1955, the prison opened in 1959 and has a capacity of 880 male inmates.

OSCI typically houses younger inmates, including those who began their sentence in a youth facility. Inmates at OSCI have opportunities working in its print shop and mail room, and provide telephone services for the Oregon Health Plan. Inmates have access to education programs, drug and alcohol treatment, and mental health treatment. In recent years, OSCI has designated 500 of its beds for transitional release inmates (those who are within six months of release from prison) with focused efforts on preparing them for release to the community.

See also

List of Oregon prisons and jails
Oregon Department of Corrections

References

Prisons in Oregon
Buildings and structures in Salem, Oregon
1959 establishments in Oregon